Altopedialiodes is a genus of satyrid butterflies.

The type species, by original designation, is Pronophila tena Hewitson, 1869.

There are ten recognised species in the Neotropics, including one undescribed species.

Species
Altopedaliodes cocytia (C. & R. Felder, [1867])
Altopedaliodes kruegeri Pyrcz, 1999
Altopedaliodes kurti Pyrcz & Viloria, 1999
Altopedaliodes nebris (Thieme, 1905)
Altopedaliodes pasicles (Hewitson, 1872)
Altopedaliodes perita (Hewitson, 1868)
Altopedaliodes reissi (Weymer, 1890)
Altopedaliodes tena (Hewitson, 1869)
Altopedaliodes zsolti Pyrcz & Viloria, 1999

References

Satyrini
Nymphalidae of South America
Butterfly genera
Taxa named by Walter Forster (entomologist)